This is a list of the Australian moth species of the family Oenosandridae. It also acts as an index to the species articles and forms part of the full List of moths of Australia.

Diceratucha xenopis (Lower, 1902)
Discophlebia blosyrodes Turner, 1903
Discophlebia catocalina R. Felder, 1874
Discophlebia celaena (Turner, 1903)
Discophlebia lipauges Turner, 1917
Discophlebia lucasii Rosenstock, 1885
Nycteropa subovalis Turner, 1941
Oenosandra boisduvalii Newman, 1856

External links 
Oenosandridae at Australian Faunal Directory

Australia
Oenosandridae